Butler Point Whaling Museum is located at Hihi, near Mangonui in New Zealand’s Doubtless Bay, a centre for whaling fleets in the 1820s–1850s.

The museum comprises the house built in the 1840s by early settler William Butler, an earlier Church Missionary Society house from the Waimate Mission moved to the site by Butler, both fitted with original furniture, and a recently built whaling museum, with a restored fully equipped whaling boat, tryworks, a collection of harpoons, models, scrimshaw and artefacts from the whalers who called into Doubtless Bay, including Charles W. Morgan. There are also substantial gardens and grounds surrounding the museum, including a 10.9 metre circumference pohutukawa tree, claimed to be the world's largest. The owners and curators, a retired ophthalmologist and his wife, live in the grounds.

See also
Whaling in New Zealand

References

Maritime museums in New Zealand
Whaling museums
Far North District
Museums in the Northland Region
Whaling in New Zealand
History of the Northland Region
1840s architecture in New Zealand